The 1908 American Tournament was the name for professional English Billiards and snooker tournaments held from October 1907 to March 1908 at Burroughes Hall. Seven professional players participated in round-robin tournaments for each sport. Tom Reece won the billiards title after defeating Charles Dawson 8,000–6,010 in a play-off final after each of them had won five group matches. Dawson won the snooker championship, with Cecil Harverson the runner-up.

Participants
For the billiards matches, a handicap was applied, with the winner of each heat being the first player to reach 8,000 points. The snooker matches were not handicapped and were determined on aggregate score. The matches were held at Burroughes Hall.

Schedule
The schedule of matches and results was as follows. Winning scores are denoted in bold.

Final standings
The final standings for each competition are shown below.

Billiards
Dawson and Reece, who both won five matches, held a play-off match to determine the overall winner. Reece won the prize for the highest proportionate aggregate. The final started on 23 March 1908, with Reece (receiving 2,000 start) finishing the first day 3,000–1,228 ahead. At the conclusion of the final on 29 March, Reece won the title by defeating Dawson 8,000–6,010.

Snooker
There was a prize of 25gns for the winner of the snooker competition.

References

1907 in English sport
1908 in English sport